Đoko Šalić (born September 18, 1995) is a Serbian-Bosnian professional basketball player.

Professional career
Šalić played in youth categories of Spars Sarajevo. In 2013, he signed his first professional contract with Serbian team Partizan Belgrade. In his first season with Partizan, he won the Serbian League defeating Crvena zvezda with 3–1 in the final series. In November 2014, he terminated his contract with Partizan. The next month, he returned to Spars Sarajevo for the rest of the season. In September 2015, he signed with the Montenegrin club Sutjeska.

In April 2019, Šalić signed for Serbian team Dynamic Belgrade. On May 30, he scored 47 points in a 116–113 win over Novi Pazar.

In July 2021, Šalić signed for Wilki Morskie Szczecin of the Polish Basketball League. On 1 January 2022, he was waived. On 3 January, Šalić signed with Cherkaski Mavpy of the Ukrainian Basketball SuperLeague.

In 2022, he played for Labas Gas Prienai of the Lithuanian Basketball League.

Serbian national team
Šalić played for Serbian national team at the 2013 FIBA Under-19 World Championship in Prague and won a silver medal. He averaged 3.4 points and 2.3 rebounds per game.

References

External links

 Đoko Šalić at aba-liga.com
 Đoko Šalić at euroleague.net
 Đoko Šalić at fiba.com

1995 births
Living people
ABA League players
Basketball League of Serbia players
Bosnia and Herzegovina expatriate basketball people in Serbia
Centers (basketball)
KK Dynamic players
KK Partizan players
KK Sutjeska players
OKK Spars players
People from Sokolac
Serbian expatriate basketball people in Bosnia and Herzegovina
Serbian expatriate basketball people in Montenegro
Serbian expatriate basketball people in Poland
Serbian expatriate basketball people in Slovenia
Serbian men's basketball players
Serbs of Bosnia and Herzegovina
Helios Suns players